Višnjić is a surname. Notable people with the surname include:

Aleksandar Višnjić (born 1976), Serbian politician
Biserka Višnjić (born 1953), former Croatian handball player
Filip Višnjić (1767–1834), popular Bosnian Serb poet and gusle player
Goran Višnjić (born 1972), Croatian actor
Josip Višnjić (born 1966), Serbian football manager and former player
Miroslav Josić Višnjić (1946–2015), Serbian writer and poet
Nenad Višnjić (born 1983), footballer

Croatian surnames
Serbian surnames
Matronymic surnames